Rain Tolk (born 9 June 1977 in Tallinn) is an Estonian actor, screenwriter and film director.

Since 2002 he has been the director, screenwriter and producer in the company Kuukulgur Film.

Selected film roles and directed films
 2006 Tühirand (feature film; role: Mati)
 2007 186 Kilometers (feature film; director, role: Hippie)
 2007 Sügisball (feature film; role: Mati)
 2008 Sauna (feature film; role: Rogosin)
 2009 The Temptation of St. Tony (feature film; role: Kleine Willy)
 2010 Sky Song (animated film; role: voice)
 2017 Paha lugu: Kokkulepe (feature film; director)	
 2017 Paha lugu: Varakevad (feature film; director)
 2017 Litsid (television series; role: Mister Tamm)
 2017 Merivälja	(television series; role: Kaabus Mees)
 2017 Minu näoga onu (feature film; role: Hugo and Young Raivo)
 2019 Kõhedad muinaslood (feature film)		
 2019 Ükssarvik (feature film; role: Businessman Per)
 2020 Asjad, millest me ei räägi (feature film)
 2022 Kalev (feature film; role: Journalist 1)

References

Living people
1977 births
Estonian male film actors
Estonian male television actors
Estonian television presenters
Estonian screenwriters
Estonian film directors
University of Tartu alumni
Male actors from Tallinn
21st-century Estonian people